Akaneiro: Demon Hunters is a dark fantasy, free-to-play video game that was developed by American McGee's company Spicy Horse. It was originally announced for release in 2012. Whereas McGee's earlier games, American McGee's Alice and Alice: Madness Returns, draw heavily from Lewis Carroll's Alice in Wonderland, Akaneiro: Demon Hunters adapts the Little Red Riding Hood fairytale, throwing her into the setting of feudal Japan. It was successfully crowd-funded through Kickstarter  and it was released as browser game.

Development
American McGee was initially inspired by the book The Lost Wolves of Japan, which depicted the destruction of wolves in Japan at the hands of foreign farmers. The idea was to combine the Red Riding Hood character with the setting of nature's destruction by humans. On top of that, the demons were added to enhance the whole story.

Reception

On its release, Akaneiro: Demon Hunters was met with "mixed or average" reviews from critics, with an aggregate score of 53/100 on Metacritic.

References

External links

Akaneiro: Demon Hunters at Kickstarter

2013 video games
Browser games
Dark fantasy video games
Fantasy video games
Free-to-play video games
Kickstarter-funded video games
Multiplayer online games
Steam Greenlight games
Video games based on Japanese mythology
Video games developed in China
Video games about demons
Video games featuring female protagonists
Video games set in feudal Japan
Video games based on fairy tales
Japan in non-Japanese culture
Spicy Horse games